Asteronotus raripilosus is a species of sea slug or dorid nudibranch, a marine gastropod mollusc in the family Discodorididae.

Distribution
This species was originally described from an unknown locality.

References

Discodorididae
Gastropods described in 1877